Xavier Batut (born 26 December 1976) is a French politician who was elected to the French National Assembly on 18 June 2017, representing the department of Seine-Maritime. From 2017 until 2020, he was a member of La République En Marche! (LREM).

Early life and career
Batut was born in Créteil, in the Val-de-Marne. After studying industrial science and technology in Rouen, he worked as a sales executive in several Citroën establishments. He has lived in Cany-Barville since 2002.

Political career
In parliament, Batut serves on the Defense Committee. In addition to his committee assignments, he is a member of the French-Slovakian Parliamentary Friendship Group, the French-Hungarian Parliamentary Friendship Group, and the French-Polish Parliamentary Friendship Group.

In February 2020, Batut decided to leave LREM.

Political positions
In July 2019, Batut abstained from a vote on the French ratification of the European Union’s Comprehensive Economic and Trade Agreement (CETA) with Canada.

See also
 2017 French legislative election

References

1976 births
Living people
Deputies of the 15th National Assembly of the French Fifth Republic
La République En Marche! politicians
Place of birth missing (living people)
Deputies of the 16th National Assembly of the French Fifth Republic